The Green Party (SZ) leadership election of 2014 was held on 25 January 2014 after party's weak result in 2013 legislative election. Incumbent leader Ondřej Liška defeated Petr Štěpánek and won his fourth term.

Voting
Voting took place on 25 January 2014. 198 delegates voted. Liška received 125 votes and Štěpánek only 66.

References

Green Party (Czech Republic) leadership elections
Green Party leadership election
Green Party (Czech Republic) leadership election
Indirect elections
Green Party (Czech Republic) leadership election